The 1936–37 Ranji Trophy was the third season of the Ranji Trophy. It was contested between 17 teams in a knockout format. Nawanagar won the title in their first appearance defeating Bengal in the final.

Highlights

 Amar Singh of Nawanagar scored 103 (in 75 minutes) & 55, and took 10/83 (6/48 & 4/35) against Sind. Against Bombay, he took 8/62 in an innings. In four matches, he scored 335 (second highest aggregate) and took 28 wickets.
 Mubarak Ali took a hat-trick split across two innings for Nawanagar vs Western India. Against Bengal, Ali scored 90 in 96 minutes batting at No.11
 Shute Banerjee who had played two matches for Bengal was prevented from appearing in the final as he joined the service of the state of Nawanagar.

Teams

North Zone
 United Provinces
 Southern Punjab
 Delhi

West Zone
 Nawanagar
 Western India
 Bombay
 Maharashtra
 Gujarat
 Sind

South Zone
 Hyderabad
 Madras
 Mysore
 Central Provinces and Berar

East Zone
 Bengal
 Central India
 Bihar
 Rajputana

The team that won the zonal title is listed in bold. The teams are listed in the approximate order in which they finished in the zone.

Zonal matches

East Zone

West Zone 

Batting first after winning the toss, Nawanagar reached 100 after 124 minutes, in the post-lunch session. Amar Singh reached his half-century in 30 minutes, while adding 106 runs for the sixth wicket. He reached his century in 75 minutes before being caught behind after making 103, an innings that included 2 sixes, 1 five and 10 fours. His team went to stumps at 293/8. Singh shone also with the ball, more so in the third and final day. Adding to the overnight score of 68/6 in his team's second innings, he made 55 in a span of 52 minutes. Sind were set a total of 358 runs to be made in three-and-a-half hours. They lost their first wicket at 10 runs before Ghulam Mohammad was dismissed for 30 post lunch. In a batting collapse that followed, Sind were all out for 106, leaving Nawanagar victorious by 252 runs.

Western India lost five wickets inside an hour after opting to bat first upon winning the toss. They reached 100 in the second session before being dismissed for 186; Hari Mali top-scored for them, remaining unbeaten on 56. EG Hans picked up three wickets for Gujarat giving away 20 runs. Gujarat went to stumps at 36/2. They lost their remaining eight wickets on day two while adding 41 runs to their overnight total. Khwaja Saeed returned with figures of 6/23 for Western India, whose top-order in reply, began slowly taking over an hour to score 50 runs. Subsequently, Faiz Ahmed and Mali accelerated before the latter reached his half-century in 85 minutes while the former scored 4 fours off JJ Yelwande's bowling. They remained unbeaten at close of the day's play taking the team's score to 196/4. Hans picked up four wickets for 12 runs the following morning including that of Ahmed. His team declared after Hari Mali fell setting Gujarat a target of 372 runs. In reply, Gujarat began poorly losing two wickets before lunch. Mali, with his slow left-arm, picked up three wickets, while Narsingrao Kesari finished with four wickets for 27 runs, dismissing Gujarat for 105.

South Zone

North Zone

Inter-Zonal Knockout stage

Semi-finals

Final

Statistics

Most runs

Most wickets

References

External links
 Ranji Trophy, 1936-37 at ESPN Cricinfo
 Ranji Trophy 1936/37 at CricketArchive (archived)

1937 in Indian cricket
Indian domestic cricket competitions